Nasiru L. Abubakar is a Nigerian journalist from Kaduna and the Editor in Chief of Dateline Nigeria, an online publication company based in Abuja, Nigeria.

Early life and education
Nasiru was born on 04 September 1977,  in Kaduna North Local Government Area of Kaduna State. Nasiru holds a PGD in Mass Communication from BUK, PGD in International Relations and Diplomacy in addition to a HND in Mass Communication from Kaduna Polytechnic, Kaduna.

Journalism
Nasiru started his journalism career at ABG Group. He worked briefly as an intern with KSMC in Kaduna before joining Daily Trust Newspapers first as a freelancer in August 2000 before becoming a permanent staff in 2004. At Daily Trust, he was appointed Acting Editor (Saturday) in 2012, before he was redeployed to the Daily as Deputy Editor. In 2014  before he was confirmed as the editor in 2016. As the editor, he won Editor of the Year in 2016 and Daily Trust won Newspaper of the year award.

In 2019, Nasiru was appointed Managing Editor of Daily Trust. He resigned in 2020 to join Dateline Nigeria as the Editor in Chief.

He writes for Gamji.com since 2015  and contributes to other outlets.

References 

1977 births
21st-century journalists
Living people
Nigerian journalists
Bayero University Kano alumni
People from Kaduna State
Nigerian Muslims
Hausa people
Nigerian writers
Nigerian editors
Hausa-language writers